Sir Edward John Williams  (1 July 1890 – 16 May 1963) was a British Labour Party politician and diplomat.

Williams was born in 1890 in Victoria, Ebbw Vale, Monmouthshire, to Emanuel Williams and his wife Ada (née James). After attending school in Victoria and Hopkinstown, he started working at Waunllwyd colliery, Ebbw Vale, at the age of 12.

Keen to educate himself, he rose to become secretary to a colliery company and in 1913 entered the Labour College in London as a student. After three years, Williams was appointed a provincial lecturer for the college, though the Great War disrupted the college and left him unemployed. Forced to return to mining in 1917, he became checkweigher and in 1919 miners' agent to the Garw district of the South Wales Miners' Federation.

He was elected as the MP for Ogmore at a by-election in May 1931, and represented the constituency until 1946. From 1946 to 1952 he served as High Commissioner to Australia.

References

1890 births
1963 deaths
Welsh Labour Party MPs
UK MPs 1929–1931
UK MPs 1931–1935
UK MPs 1935–1945
High Commissioners of the United Kingdom to Australia
Members of the Privy Council of the United Kingdom
Miners' Federation of Great Britain-sponsored MPs
National Union of Mineworkers-sponsored MPs
Knights Commander of the Order of St Michael and St George
Ministers in the Attlee governments, 1945–1951
Members of Glamorgan County Council
People from Ebbw Vale
Members of the Parliament of the United Kingdom for Monmouthshire